Spite or spitefulness as a sentiment, action, or a personality trait has several possible meanings. According to the American Psychological Association there is "no standard definition of spitefulness. Spite can be broadly defined to include any vindictive or mean-spirited actions. Alternatively, a narrower definition includes the requirement that spiteful acts involve some degree of self-harm." One possible definition of spite is to intentionally annoy, hurt, or upset even when there might be no (apparent) gain, and even when those actions might cause the person spiting harm, as well. Spiteful words or actions are delivered in such a way that it is clear that the person is delivering them just to annoy, hurt, or upset. 

In his 1929 examination of emotional disturbances, Psychology and Morals: An Analysis of Character, J. A. Hadfield uses deliberately spiteful acts to illustrate the difference between disposition and sentiment.

Spite has also been studied as a trait of human personality; although in general spite has been largely ignored in academic literature. University of Washington researchers David K Marcus, Virgil Zeigler-Hill, Sterett H Mercer, and Alyssa L Norris were the first to develop a personality scale designed to measure and assess the trait of spitefulness which was published in 2014 in Psychological Assessment.

Spite in literature
The Underground Man, in Fyodor Dostoevsky's novella Notes from Underground, is an example of spite. His motivation remains constantly spiteful, undercutting his own existence and ability to live.

Further reading

See also

References

Hatred
Emotions
Concepts in ethics